Marrah may refer to:

 Marrah Mountains, Sudan
 Maraq, Markazi, a village in Iran

See also 
 Marah (disambiguation)
 Marra (disambiguation)